This is a list of earthquakes in 1981. Only earthquakes of magnitude 6 or above are included, unless they result in damage and/or casualties, or are notable for some other reason. Events in remote areas will not be listed but included in statistics and maps. Countries are entered on the lists in order of their status in this particular year. All dates are listed according to UTC time. Maximum intensities are indicated on the Mercalli intensity scale and are sourced from United States Geological Survey (USGS) ShakeMap data. Another year of below average activity. The number of magnitude 7.0+ events was higher than in 1980 but at 10 was still below normal. The largest event was a magnitude 7.7 which struck Samoa in September. Other areas impacted by large events were Greece, New Zealand, Mexico and Chile. Out of the 6,700 deaths in 1981 the majority were in Iran. Over the summer there was 2 large events each causing 3,000 deaths. In January, Indonesia and China were struck by events which left a combined 450 deaths.

By death toll

Listed are earthquakes with at least 10 dead.

By magnitude

Listed are earthquakes with at least 7.0 magnitude.

By month

January

February

March

April

May

June

July

August

September

October

November

December

References 

1981
1981 earthquakes
1981